Ango Territory is a territory in the Bas-Uele Province of the Democratic Republic of the Congo. The administrative capital is located at Ango. The territory borders Bondo Territory to the west, Central African Republic to the north, Bambesa Territory to the southwest, Poko Territory to the southeast and Dungu Territory in Haut-Uele Province to the east.

Subdivisions
The territory contains the following chiefdoms:
Ezo Chiefdom
Mopoi Chiefdom 
Ngindo Chiefdom 
Sasa Chiefdom

References

Territories of Bas-Uélé Province